Guilherme Melaragno (born 9 August 1993) is a Brazilian fencer. He competed in the men's épée event at the 2016 Summer Olympics.

References

External links
 

1993 births
Living people
Brazilian male épée fencers
Olympic fencers of Brazil
Fencers at the 2016 Summer Olympics
Place of birth missing (living people)
Fencers at the 2010 Summer Youth Olympics